Raffaello, Raffaele or Raffaellino is an Italian given name. It usually refers to Raphael (a.k.a. Raffaello Sanzio da Urbino), an Italian painter and architect of the High Renaissance.

Raffaello may also refer to:

 Raffaello (confection), a confection
 Raffaello MPLM, one of the three Multi-Purpose Logistics Modules used to transfer supplies to the International Space Station
 SS Raffaello, an Italian ocean liner

People

People with the given name Raffaello or Raffaellino include:
Raffaello Carboni, Italian writer
Raffaello Ducceschi, Italian race walker
Raffaello Fabretti, Italian antiquary
Raffaello Funghini, Italian catholic clergyman
Raffaello Gestro, Italian entomologist
Raffaello Maffei, Italian humanist, historian and theologian
Raffaello Matarazzo, Italian film-maker
Raffaello da Montelupo, sculptor and architect of the Italian Renaissance
Raffaello Sanzio Morghen, Italian engraver
Raffaello Vanni, Italian painter of the Baroque
Raffaellino del Colle
Raffaellino del Garbo
Raffaellino da Reggio

See also
Raphael (disambiguation)
Raffaella
Raffaele

Italian masculine given names